The 1986–87 season was the 32nd season of the European Cup, Europe's premier club football competition. The tournament was won by Porto, who came from behind in the final against Bayern Munich to give a Portuguese club its first title since 1962.

Steaua București, the defending champions, were eliminated by Anderlecht in the second round, having received a bye to reach that stage of the tournament due to the absence of the English champions (Liverpool), as the ban on English clubs in European competitions was now in its second season.

Bracket

First round

|}

First leg

Second leg

Vítkovice won 3–2 on aggregate.

Porto won 10–0 on aggregate.

Brøndby won 6–3 on aggregate.

Dynamo Berlin won 7–3 on aggregate.

Beşiktaş won 3–0 on aggregate.

3–3 on aggregate; APOEL won on away goals.

Celtic won 3–0 on aggregate.

Dynamo Kyiv won 3–1 on aggregate.

Bayern Munich won 2–0 on aggregate.

Austria Wien won 6–0 on aggregate.

Anderlecht won 3–1 on aggregate.

Rosenborg won 2–1 on aggregate.

Red Star Belgrade won 4–2 on aggregate.

Real Madrid won 5–1 on aggregate.

Juventus won 11–0 on aggregate.

Second round

|}

1 APOEL withdrew for political reasons.

First leg

Second leg

Porto won 3–1 on aggregate.

Brøndby won 3–2 on aggregate.

Dynamo Kyiv won 4–2 on aggregate.

Bayern Munich won 3–1 on aggregate.

Anderlecht won 3–1 on aggregate.

Red Star Belgrade won 7–1 on aggregate.

1–1 on aggregate; Real Madrid won on penalties.

Quarter-finals

|}

First leg

Second leg

Porto won 2–1 on aggregate.

Dynamo Kyiv won 7–0 on aggregate.

Bayern Munich won 7–2 on aggregate.

4–4 on aggregate; Real Madrid won on away goals.

Semi-finals

|}

First leg

Second leg

As per the decision by referee Michel Vautrot, the match was interrupted only a few minutes in with the score still tied at 0–0 due to Real Madrid fans throwing objects, including golf balls, onto the pitch. Play resumed 10 minutes later and completed without interruption. At a disciplinary hearing a few days later, UEFA punished Real Madrid with one match behind closed doors and an additional one-match stadium ban, both enforced during Real Madrid's 1987–88 European Cup participation.Bayern Munich won 4–2 on aggregate.

Porto won 4–2 on aggregate.

Final

Top scorers

Notes

References

External links
1986–87 European Cup at UEFA
1986–87 All matches – season at UEFA website
European Cup results at Rec.Sport.Soccer Statistics Foundation
 All scorers 1986–87 European Cup according to protocols UEFA
1986/87 European Cup - results and line-ups (archive)
 European Cup 1986-87 – results, protocols, players statistics
 website eurocups-uefa.ru European Cup 1986-87 – results, protocols
 website Football Archive 1986–87 European Cup

European Cup
European Champion Clubs' Cup seasons